The following is a list of FCC-licensed radio stations in the U.S. state of Florida, which can be sorted by their call signs, frequencies, cities of license, licensees, and programming formats.

List of radio stations

Defunct
 WAGE
 WAXA
 WBFT-LP
 WCFI
 WCFQ-LP
 WCNU
 WDDV
 WEAG
 WEKJ-LP
 WFAB
 WFHA-LP
 WFLA (Boca Raton, Florida)
 WFBO-LP
 WFJV-LP
 WFLP-LP
 WFLU-LP
 WFSH
 WFSX
 WFTI-FM
 WGAG-FM
 WGRV-LP
 WHBT
 WHTR-LP
 WINV
 WKGC
 WKIZ
 WKJO-LP
 WLAS-LP
 WLMS
 WLVF (AM)
 WMJX
 WNOG
 WNPL
 WNRG-LP
 WORZ-LP
 WPCU-LP
 WPLP
 WRAP
 WREH
 WSBR
 WSUN
 WSVE
 WTHA-LP
 WVFP-LP
 WVOI
 WVST
 WWSD
 WYFR
 WZRO-LP

See also
 WRMI, a shortwave radio station that broadcasts from Okeechobee, Florida
 Florida media
 List of newspapers in Florida
 List of television stations in Florida
 Media of cities in Florida: Fort Lauderdale, Gainesville, Jacksonville, Key West, Lakeland, Miami, Orlando, St. Petersburg, Tallahassee, Tampa

References

Bibliography
  
  
   + FM Stations on the Air: Florida

External links

  (Directory ceased in 2017)
 Florida Association of Broadcasters
 Florida Antique Wireless Group (est. 1991)
 Jacksonville Antique Radio Society (est. 2001)

Images

 
Florida
Florida-related lists